Ashish Kumar Jha (born December 31, 1970) is an Indian-American general internist physician and academic serving as the White House COVID-19 Response Coordinator. He is currently on a short-term leave from the Brown University School of Public Health where he served as the Dean. Prior to Brown, he was the K.T. Li Professor of Global Health at Harvard T.H. Chan School of Public Health, faculty director of the Harvard Global Health Institute, and a Senior Advisor at Albright Stonebridge Group. Jha is recognized as one of the leading health policy scholars in the nation. Jha's role at Brown University focuses on improving the quality and cost of health care, and on the impact of public health policy.

Jha succeeded Jeffrey Zients as White House COVID-19 Response Coordinator on April 5, 2022.

Education and early career 
Ashish Kumar Jha was born in Pursaulia, Madhubani, Bihar, India, on December 31, 1970. Both of Jha's parents worked as educators. His family moved to Toronto, Canada, in 1979 and to Morris County, New Jersey, USA in 1984. 

Jha graduated from Boonton High School in Boonton, New Jersey, as the valedictorian of the class of 1988 and the editor in chief of the school's newspaper. He attended Columbia University, where he studied pre-med and economics and was president of Earl Hall's student governing board. Jha graduated from Columbia in 1992 with a B.A. in economics. 

Jha received his M.D. from Harvard Medical School in 1997 and then trained as a resident in internal medicine at the University of California, San Francisco. He completed a Chief Residency year at UCSF. Between 2001 and 2002, he served as the Inaugural Under Secretary's Special Fellow for Quality and Safety in the Department of Veterans Affairs. Jha returned to Boston in 2002 to complete his fellowship in general medicine at Brigham and Women's Hospital and Harvard Medical School.

In 2004, Jha completed a Master of Public Health degree at the Harvard School of Public Health.

Career 
Jha worked as the K.T. Li Professor of Global Health at Harvard T.H. Chan School of Public Health and the Faculty Director of the Harvard Global Health Institute, as well as a Senior Advisor at Albright Stonebridge Group. On September 1, 2020, he became the Dean of the Brown University School of Public Health. He remains an Adjunct Professor of Global Health in the Department of Health Policy and Management at Harvard T.H. Chan School of Public Health.

COVID-19 pandemic 
In mid-March 2020, Jha called for a two-week national quarantine across the United States to reduce the effects of the COVID-19 pandemic. He argued that it takes up to two weeks for those already infected with the virus to begin showing symptoms; given the lack of COVID-19 testing in the U.S., a two-week quarantine would help public health better assess how widespread the disease is to better inform decision-making. He has also advocated for the need to vastly strengthen healthcare infrastructure and increase the manufacturing of personal protective equipment to keep healthcare workers safe. He has testified multiple times in front of Congress as an expert helping guide policymakers on how best to help the US navigate the pandemic.

Between March 2020 and May 2021, Jha was mentioned on cable and network news approximately 60,000 times.

Jha serves on the National Advisory Council for COVID Collaborative.

In March 2022, it was announced that Jha would succeed Jeffrey Zients as the White House Coronavirus Response Coordinator.

Brown University School of Public Health 
Jha took office as the third dean of the Brown University School of Public Health in September 2020, following appointment in March that year. During Jha's tenure and the concurrent COVID-19 pandemic, the school expanded its programs, physical footprint, and faculty.

Awards and honors 
 2013: Elected Member, National Academy of Medicine
2020: The Boston Globe named Jha one of the "Bostonians of the Year"
2021: Listed in Fortune's annual ranking of "World’s 50 Greatest Leaders"
2021: Meeting the Moment for Public Health award from Johnson & Johnson Research America
2022: Honorary Doctorate from the University of Massachusetts Lowell. 
2023: John Jay Award from Columbia College

References

External links 

American public health doctors
Harvard School of Public Health faculty
Brown University faculty
COVID-19 pandemic in the United States
Health policy in the United States
Science communicators
American physicians of Indian descent
Harvard School of Public Health alumni
Harvard Medical School alumni
Columbia College (New York) alumni
Members of the National Academy of Medicine
Indian emigrants to the United States
People from Madhubani, India
1970 births
Living people
Boonton High School alumni
People from Morris County, New Jersey
Physicians from New Jersey